Dorcaschema is a New World genus of longhorn beetles from the subfamily Lamiinae.

References

Dorcaschematini